Acropora dendrum is a species of acroporid coral that was first described by Bassett-Smith in 1890. The species is rated as vulnerable on the IUCN Red List, with a decreasing population. It is not common but found over a large area, and is listed on CITES Appendix II.

Description
The radial corallites are almost submerged into the branches, making them feel smooth. It has small axial corallites on the end of each branchlet. It is cream of pale brown in colour, there are no similar-looking species, and it is rare.

Distribution
Acropora dendrum is found over a large area but is not common; the East China Sea, the Indian Ocean, the Indo-Pacific, Southeast Asia, Australia, Japan, Vanuatu, Samoa, and Tonga. The species threatened by the global reduction of coral reefs, the increase of temperature causing bleaching, disease, coral harvesting, climate change, fishing, human development, pollution, and being prey to starfish Acanthaster planci. It is sometimes found in Marine Protected Areas. It is listed as a vulnerable species on the IUCN Red List as the population is decreasing, and is listed under Appendix II of CITES.

Taxonomy
It was first described by P.W. Bassett-Smith in 1890 in the South China Sea as Acropora dendrum.

References

Acropora
Animals described in 1890
Vulnerable animals